SM UB-93 was a German Type UB III submarine or U-boat in the German Imperial Navy during World War I. She was commissioned into the German Imperial Navy on 15 May 1918 as SM UB-93.

UB-93 was surrendered to Britain on 21 November 1918 and broken up in Rochester in 1922.

Construction

She was built by AG Vulcan of Hamburg and following just under a year of construction, launched at Hamburg on 12  April 1918. UB-93 was commissioned later the same year under the command of Oblt.z.S. Karl Thouret. Like all Type UB III submarines, UB-93 carried 10 torpedoes and was armed with a  deck gun. UB-93 had a displacement of  while surfaced and  when submerged. Her engines enabled her to travel at  when surfaced and  when submerged.

References

Notes

Citations

Bibliography 

 

German Type UB III submarines
World War I submarines of Germany
U-boats commissioned in 1918
1918 ships
Ships built in Hamburg